Zombor, also referred to as Gyula II, was a Hungarian tribal leader in the middle of the 10th century. He visited Constantinople, where he was baptized in 952 with the baptismal name of Stephen.

Life
He descended from a family whose members held the hereditary title gyula, which was the second in rank among the leaders of the Hungarian tribal federation. Hungarian scholars identify him as Zombor (Zubor) who is mentioned in the 13th-century Gesta Hungarorum, although the anonymous author of the Gesta presents Gyula (Gyyla/Geula) and Zombor as being brothers. According to the Hungarian chronicles, his family’s progenitor was one of the seven conquering chiefs who occupied Transylvania at the time of the Hungarian conquest of the Carpathian Basin. 

The Hungarian historian Gyula Kristó argues that the area where his domains were situated around 950 lay in the region bordered by the rivers Temes (Timiș), Maros (Mureș), Körös (Criș), Tisza and Tutisz (unknown, but possibly the Béga (Bega)), because it equals to the entire dwelling area of Turkia (Hungary) as described by the contemporary Byzantine Emperor Constantine Porphyrogenitus. The Romanian-born American historian, Florin Curta suggests that it is possible that the gyula and the harka (title of the ther leader of the Hungarian tribal federation) ruled over the southern region of the Carpathian Basin, because most finds of 10th-century artifacts of Byzantine origin found in Hungary cluster at the confluence of the rivers Tisza and Maros. According to the Hungarian Péter Váczy, Gyula’s tribe moved to Transylvania in his time.

Ioannes Skylitzes narrates that around 952 Gyula visited Constantinople, where he was baptized, and Emperor Constantine VII lifted him from the baptismal font. While in Constantinople, he also received the honorary title patrikios.

Gyula was given a bishop named Hierotheos who accompanied him back to Turkia (Hungary). Thus Gyula, who received the Christian name of Stephen, adopted the Christian faith, what is more, its Eastern Orthodox (Byzantine) variety.

Gyula II had a son, Prokui (Gyula III), his successor as tribal leader in Transylvania, and two daughters, Karold and Sarolt. The latter became the wife of Géza, Grand Prince of the Hungarians. Their only known son, Stephen I, was crowned as the first king of Hungary.

See also 
Gyula (title)
Gyula III
History of Transylvania
Kingdom of Hungary in the Middle Ages
Romania in the Early Middle Ages

References

Sources 
Berend, Nóra – Laszlovszky, József – Szakács, Béla Zsolt: The Kingdom of Hungary; in: Berend, Nora (Editor): Christianization and the Rise of Christian Monarchy: Scandinavia, Central Europe and Rus’ c. 900-1200; Cambridge University Press, 2007, Cambridge&New York; 
Curta, Florin: Southeastern Europe in the Middle Ages - 500-1250; Cambridge University Press, 2006, Cambridge; 
Kristó, Gyula (General Editor) – Engel, Pál - Makk, Ferenc (Editors): Korai Magyar történeti lexikon (9-14. század) /Encyclopedia of the Early Hungarian History (9th-14th centuries)/; Akadémiai Kiadó, 1994, Budapest;  (the entry “gyula” was written by Alfréd Márton, “Gyula” by Sándor László Tóth and László Szegfű)
Kristó, Gyula: Early Transylvania (895-1324); Lucidus Kiadó, 2003, Budapest; 

Rulers of Transylvania 
Eastern Orthodox Christians from Hungary
Magyar tribal chieftains
Medieval Transylvanian people
10th-century Hungarian people
Converts to Eastern Orthodoxy from paganism